Stigmella pallida is a moth of the family Nepticulidae. It is found in Ohio, United States.
The wingspan is about 3.8 mm.

The larvae feed on Salix species. They mine the leaves of their host plant. The mine is long and linear and located on the lower surface of the leaf. It gradually broadens throughout its length. The frass is deposited centrally and somewhat loosely as a black line.

External links
Nepticulidae of North America
A taxonomic revision of the North American species of Stigmella (Lepidoptera: Nepticulidae)

Nepticulidae
Moths of North America
Moths described in 1912